Jorge Ovidio Lazaroff Cesconi (28 February 1950 – 22 March 1989) was an Uruguayan composer, singer and guitarist.

His father was a Bulgarian immigrant and his mother was born in Salta, Argentina.

Discography
Albañil (1979, Ayuí)
Dos (1983, Ayuí)
Tangatos (1985, Ayuí)
Pelota al medio (1989, Orfeo)
Albañil / Dos (1996, Ayuí) (+)
Éxitos de nunca (Ayuí-Posdata) (+)
Tangatos / Pelota al medio (Ayuí) (+)
(+) CD Reeditions.

External links
 Lazaroff in Gourmet Musical 

1950 births
1989 deaths
Uruguayan singer-songwriters
Uruguayan people of Argentine descent
Uruguayan people of Bulgarian descent
20th-century Uruguayan male singers
20th-century guitarists
Deaths from cancer in Uruguay
Deaths from lymphoma